The Casa de los Pinelo is a Renaissance building located in the centre of Seville in Spain. It houses both the Real Academia Sevillana de Buenas Letras and the Real Academia de Bellas Artes de Santa Isabel de Hungría.

Palaces in Seville
Renaissance architecture in Seville
Art museums and galleries in Spain
Museums in Seville